Julio Antonio Elícegui Cans (5 December 1910 — 31 August 2001) was a Spanish footballer who played as a forward.

Club career
Elícegui began his career playing youth football for Arin Sport, Azkoyen and Beasain, before signing for Real Unión in 1930. In 1931, the club changed their name to Unión Irún, as a result of the proclamation of the Second Spanish Republic and was relegated to the Segunda División at the end of the 1931–32 La Liga season. Elícegui finished the 1932–33 Segunda División season as top scorer, with 30 goals from 18 games, including scoring five for Unión Irún in a 6–0 victory over Castellón on 12 March 1933.

In the summer of 1933, Elícegui signed for Athletic Madrid for 50,000 Ptas, winning promotion from the Segunda División in his first season at the club, scoring 15 league goals in the process. In 1936, Elícegui's career was put on hold, due to the Spanish Civil War, where Elícegui took up a colonel role in northern Spain. In 1939, following the resumption of football, Elícegui remained at Athletic Madrid, now renamed Athletic Aviación, winning the 1939–40 La Liga title.

In 1940, Elícegui joined Segunda División club Deportivo La Coruña, winning promotion back to La Liga in 1941, scoring 26 goals in 18 games. Elícegui remained at the club for two more seasons, joining Gimnàstic for a short spell in 1943, before retiring due to an ankle injury.

International career
On 2 April 1933, Elícegui made his debut for Spain, scoring twice, in a 3–0 win against Portugal. Elícegui scored a hat-trick in his final appearance for Spain on 21 May 1933, in a 13–0 win against Bulgaria.

International goals
Scores and results list Spain's goal tally first.

References

1910 births
2001 deaths
People from Tudela (comarca)
Spanish footballers
Footballers from Navarre
Association football forwards
Real Unión footballers
Atlético Madrid footballers
Deportivo de La Coruña players
Gimnàstic de Tarragona footballers
La Liga players
Segunda División players
Spain international footballers
SD Beasain footballers